The 2021 Population and Housing Census is a planned census in Greece that was conducted by the Hellenic Statistical Authority as part of the wider 2021 European Union census. As with the 2011 census, it enumerates the number of people in the country and surveys the demographic, economic, and social characteristics of the population, as well as the types of building stock available in the country. The census complies with both European Union and United Nations census guidelines. The full set of results will be available by 31 March 2024.

Smartphone and geolocation technologies were utilized in order to carry out the census. A design competition was launched in September 2018, asking university students to design the census logo, and the winner was announced in 2019.

Background
The 2011 Greek census showed that the percentage of people of Greece had declined by 0.88%, compared to the 2001 Greek census, to 10,815,197 people. This demographic trend is expected to continue if fertility rates remain low, with the Hellenic Statistical Authority estimating the decline of the total population of Greece to 9.7 million by 2050 in that scenario. Similarly, Eurostat estimates that, without migration, the Greek population will decline to 9.3 million by 2050, and to 8.9 million with lower fertility; the main Eurostat scenario projects the country's population as 9.1 million in 2050. Historically, censuses in Greece have been beset by undercounting issues. The winter 2021 census reported 10.48 million people in the country, which is 3.1% less than the 2011 census. It has been argued that the accuracy of the 2021 census is questionable, as some older people struggled to answer it online, illegal migrants were not counted, and many people were hostile to the state.

Results 
Official results for permanent population were published on 17th March 2023. A total of 10,482,487 people were counted during the census, denoting a 3.1% decline from the population of the 2011 census. Out of the total number of inhabitants, 5,125,977 (48.9% of the total population) were male and 5,356,510 (51.1% of the total population) were female. The census' results per administrative region are the following:

See also 
2011 Greek census
Demographics of Greece

References

2021
2021 in Greece
Greek